Serine/threonine protein kinase NLK is an enzyme that in humans is encoded by the NLK gene. Its name is an abbreviation for Nemo-Like Kinase, Nemo (nmo) being the Drosophila ortholog of the mammalian NLK gene. This enzyme is a member of the Mitogen-activated protein kinase (MAPK) family, although not explicitly designated as such (it does not even have a numbered MAPK code). It is a highly divergent, atypical member of the MAPK group, lacking most features so characteristic of most mitogen-activated protein kinases (e.g. it does not have the dual phosphorylation motifs of typical MAPKs, and is not phosphorylated by any known MAP2 kinases). Its activation mechanism and downstream targets are still not well characterized.

References

Further reading

Protein kinases